Hyde Park Live is a live album by the Rolling Stones, released in 2013. It was recorded at Hyde Park, London on 6 and 13 July 2013 during the band's 50 and Counting Tour. The album was released exclusively as a digital download through iTunes on 22 July 2013 for a limited time of four weeks. The album debuted at #16 in the UK and #19 in the US. The same concert was later issued on DVD as Sweet Summer Sun: Live in Hyde Park.

Background
In 1969, The Rolling Stones performed a free concert in Hyde Park just two days after the death of founding member Brian Jones, with the gig also serving as the introduction to new guitarist Mick Taylor. As part of the 50 & Counting tour that celebrated The Rolling Stones' 50th anniversary celebrations, a new Hyde Park concert was scheduled in 2013, supported by The Vaccines, The Temper Trap, and Gary Clark Jr. The 65,000 tickets were sold out in three minutes. Taylor, who left the band in 1974, appears on two tracks: "Midnight Rambler" and show closer "(I Can't Get No) Satisfaction".

Track listing

Sweet Summer Sun 

A video recording of the concert, Sweet Summer Sun – Hyde Park Live, was issued on 11 November 2013 on DVD and Blu-ray, along with CDs and LPs.

Track listing

Personnel
The Rolling Stones
 Mick Jagger – lead vocals, guitar, harmonica
 Keith Richards – guitars, vocals
 Ronnie Wood – guitars
 Charlie Watts – drums
 Mick Taylor – slide guitar on "Midnight Rambler", acoustic guitar and backing vocals on "(I Can't Get No) Satisfaction"

Additional personnel
 Darryl Jones – bass, backing vocals
 Chuck Leavell – keyboards, backing vocals, cowbell on "Honky Tonk Women"
 Bernard Fowler – backing vocals, percussion
 Lisa Fischer – backing vocals, percussion
 Bobby Keys – saxophone
 Tim Ries – saxophone, keyboards
 Matt Clifford – French horn on "You Can't Always Get What You Want"
 Voce Chamber Choir – choir on "You Can't Always Get What You Want"
 London Youth Choir – choir on "You Can't Always Get What You Want"

Charts

Weekly charts

Year-end charts

Certifications

References

External links
 
 
 

2013 live albums
2013 video albums
Live video albums
The Rolling Stones live albums
The Rolling Stones video albums
Eagle Rock Entertainment live albums
Eagle Rock Entertainment video albums